Daubrée is a lunar impact crater that is located to the southwest of the Mare Serenitatis, just to the west-southwest of the crater Menelaus in the Montes Haemus range. The small lunar mare Lacus Hiemalis lies along the southwest rim of Daubrée. The crater was named after French geologist Gabriel A. Daubrée. It was previously designated Menelaus S. 

This is a horseshoe-shaped formation with the rim open to the northwest. The interior has been flooded by basaltic lava, leaving a level, featureless floor. The rim has a low cut through the southern end, and the eastern rim is attached to low ridges belonging to the Montes Haemus.

References

External links

Daubrée at The Moon Wiki
 LTO-60A1 Daubrée — L&PI topographic map.
 

Impact craters on the Moon